In electrical engineering, statistical computing and bioinformatics, the Baum–Welch algorithm is a special case of the expectation–maximization algorithm used to find the unknown parameters of a hidden Markov model (HMM). It makes use of the forward-backward algorithm to compute the statistics for the expectation step.

History
The Baum–Welch algorithm was named after its inventors Leonard E. Baum and Lloyd R. Welch. The algorithm and the Hidden Markov models were first described in a series of articles by Baum and his peers at the IDA Center for Communications Research, Princeton in the late 1960s and early 1970s. One of the first major applications of HMMs was to the field of speech processing. In the 1980s, HMMs were emerging as a useful tool in the analysis of biological systems and information, and in particular genetic information. They have since become an important tool in the probabilistic modeling of genomic sequences.

Description
A hidden Markov model describes the joint probability of a collection of "hidden" and observed discrete random variables.  It relies on the assumption that the i-th hidden variable given the (i − 1)-th hidden variable is independent of previous hidden variables, and the current observation variables depend only on the current hidden state.

The Baum–Welch algorithm uses the well known EM algorithm to find the maximum likelihood estimate of the parameters of a hidden Markov model given a set of observed feature vectors.

Let  be a discrete hidden random variable with  possible values (i.e. We assume there are  states in total).

The initial state distribution (i.e. when ) is given by

The observation variables  can take one of  possible values. We also assume the observation given the "hidden" state is time independent. The probability of a certain observation  at time  for state  is given by

Algorithm
Set  with random initial conditions. They can also be set using prior information about the parameters if it is available; this can speed up the algorithm and also steer it toward the desired local maximum.

Forward procedure
Let , the probability of seeing the observations  and being in state  at time . This is found recursively:

Since this series converges exponentially to zero, the algorithm will numerically underflow for longer sequences.

Backward procedure
Let  that is the probability of the ending partial sequence  given starting state  at time . We calculate  as,

Update
We can now calculate the temporary variables, according to Bayes' theorem:

which is the probability of being in state  at time  given the observed sequence  and the parameters 

The parameters of the  hidden Markov model  can now be updated:

which is the expected frequency spent in state  at time .

which is the expected number of transitions from state i to state j compared to the expected total number of transitions away from state i. To clarify, the number of transitions away from state i does not mean transitions to a different state j, but to any state including itself. This is equivalent to the number of times state i is observed in the sequence from t = 1 to t = T − 1.

where

These steps are now repeated iteratively until a desired level of convergence.

Note: It is possible to over-fit a particular data set. That is, . The algorithm also does not guarantee a global maximum.

Multiple sequences

The algorithm described thus far assumes a single observed sequence . However, in many situations, there are several sequences observed: .

where

is an indicator function

Example
Suppose we have a chicken from which we collect eggs at noon every day. Now whether or not the chicken has laid eggs for collection depends on some unknown factors that are hidden. We can however (for simplicity) assume that the chicken is always in one of two states that influence whether the chicken lays eggs, and that this state only depends on the state on the previous day. Now we don't know the state at the initial starting point, we don't know the transition probabilities between the two states and we don't know the probability that the chicken lays an egg given a particular state. To start we first guess the transition and emission matrices.

We then take a set of observations (E = eggs, N = no eggs): N, N, N, N, N, E, E, N, N, N

This gives us a set of observed transitions between days: NN, NN, NN, NN, NE, EE, EN, NN, NN

The next step is to estimate a new transition matrix. For example, the probability of the sequence NN and the state being  then  is given by the following,

This gives us the updated transition matrix:

Next, we want to estimate a new emission matrix,

The new estimate for the E coming from  emission is now .

This allows us to calculate the emission matrix as described above in the algorithm, by adding up the probabilities for the respective observed sequences.

Again we then normalize to give an updated initial vector.

Finally we repeat these steps until the resulting probabilities converge satisfactorily.

Applications

Speech recognition
Hidden Markov Models were first applied to speech recognition by James K. Baker in 1975. Continuous speech recognition occurs by the following steps, modeled by a HMM. Feature analysis is first undertaken on temporal and/or spectral features of the speech signal. This produces an observation vector. The feature is then compared to all sequences of the speech recognition units. These units could be phonemes, syllables, or whole-word units. A lexicon decoding system is applied to constrain the paths investigated, so only words in the system's lexicon (word dictionary) are investigated. Similar to the lexicon decoding, the system path is further constrained by the rules of grammar and syntax. Finally, semantic analysis is applied and the system outputs the recognized utterance. A limitation of many HMM applications to speech recognition is that the current state only depends on the state at the previous time-step, which is unrealistic for speech as dependencies are often several time-steps in duration. The Baum–Welch algorithm also has extensive applications in solving HMMs used in the field of speech synthesis.

Cryptanalysis
The Baum–Welch algorithm is often used to estimate the parameters of HMMs in deciphering hidden or noisy information and consequently is often used in cryptanalysis. In data security an observer would like to extract information from a data stream without knowing all the parameters of the transmission. This can involve reverse engineering a channel encoder. HMMs and as a consequence the Baum–Welch algorithm have also been used to identify spoken phrases in encrypted VoIP calls. In addition HMM cryptanalysis is an important tool for automated investigations of cache-timing data. It allows for the automatic discovery of critical algorithm state, for example key values.

Applications in bioinformatics

Finding genes

Prokaryotic
The GLIMMER (Gene Locator and Interpolated Markov ModelER) software was an early gene-finding program used for the identification of coding regions in prokaryotic DNA. GLIMMER uses Interpolated Markov Models (IMMs) to identify the coding regions and distinguish them from the noncoding DNA. The latest release (GLIMMER3) has been shown to have increased specificity and accuracy compared with its predecessors with regard to predicting translation initiation sites, demonstrating an average 99% accuracy in locating 3' locations compared to confirmed genes in prokaryotes.

Eukaryotic
The GENSCAN webserver is a gene locator capable of analyzing eukaryotic sequences up to one million base-pairs (1 Mbp) long. GENSCAN utilizes a general inhomogeneous, three periodic, fifth order Markov model of DNA coding regions. Additionally, this model accounts for differences in gene density and structure (such as intron lengths) that occur in different isochores. While most integrated gene-finding software (at the time of GENSCANs release) assumed input sequences contained exactly one gene, GENSCAN solves a general case where partial, complete, or multiple genes (or even no gene at all) is present. GENSCAN was shown to exactly predict exon location with 90% accuracy with 80% specificity compared to an annotated database.

Copy-number variation detection
Copy-number variations (CNVs) are an abundant form of genome structure variation in humans. A discrete-valued bivariate HMM (dbHMM) was used assigning chromosomal regions to seven distinct states: unaffected regions, deletions, duplications and four transition states.  Solving this model using Baum-Welch demonstrated the ability to predict the location of CNV breakpoint to approximately 300 bp from micro-array experiments. This magnitude of resolution enables more precise correlations between different CNVs and across populations than previously possible, allowing the study of CNV population frequencies. It also demonstrated a direct inheritance pattern for a particular CNV.

Implementations
Accord.NET in C#
ghmm C library with Python bindings that supports both discrete and continuous emissions.
Jajapy Python library that implements Baum-Welch on various kind of Markov Models ( HMM,  MC, MDP,  CTMC).
HMMBase package for Julia.
HMMFit function in the RHmm package for R.
hmmtrain in MATLAB
rustbio in Rust

See also
 Viterbi algorithm
 Hidden Markov model
 EM algorithm
 Maximum likelihood
 Speech recognition
 Bioinformatics
 Cryptanalysis

References

External links
 A comprehensive review of HMM methods and software in bioinformatics –  Profile Hidden Markov Models
 Early HMM publications by Baum:
 A Maximization Technique Occurring in the Statistical Analysis of Probabilistic Functions of Markov Chains
 An inequality with applications to statistical estimation for probabilistic functions of Markov processes and to a model for ecology
 Statistical Inference for Probabilistic Functions of Finite State Markov Chains
 The Shannon Lecture by Welch, which speaks to how the algorithm can be implemented efficiently:
 Hidden Markov Models and the Baum–Welch Algorithm, IEEE Information Theory Society Newsletter, Dec. 2003.
 An alternative to the Baum–Welch algorithm, the Viterbi Path Counting algorithm:
 Davis, Richard I. A.; Lovell, Brian C.; "Comparing and evaluating HMM ensemble training algorithms using train and test and condition number criteria", Pattern Analysis and Applications, vol. 6, no. 4, pp. 327–336, 2003.
 An Interactive Spreadsheet for Teaching the Forward-Backward Algorithm (spreadsheet and article with step-by-step walkthrough)
 Formal derivation of the Baum–Welch algorithm
 Implementation of the Baum–Welch algorithm

Randomized algorithms
Bioinformatics algorithms
Markov models